The 1919 Argentine Primera División was the 28th season of top-flight football in Argentina. The official "Asociación Argentina de Football" (AFA) league championship was abandoned mid season by the majority of the clubs, which joined the new "Asociación Amateurs de Football" (AAmF) while six clubs remained with the official body.

In the AFA league, Boca Juniors was crowned champion with 14 fixtures to be played, while Racing won its 7th league title at AAmF.

Club Eureka debuted in the AFA championship, while Vélez Sársfield played its first Primera División championship in the AAmF after being disaffiliated from the official body.

Final tables

Asociación Argentina de Football - Copa Campeonato
Out of 19 teams that started to compete in the championship, only 6 remained at the end of the season, after the first part of the tournament was annulled and re-started. The 13 teams that had been disaffiliated or expelled joined dissident "Asociación Amateurs de Football".

Asociación Amateurs de Football

Notes

References

Argentine Primera División seasons
Prim
1919 in South American football